Loewenstein Peak is an ice-free peak, located  northeast of Vashka Crag in the Cruzen Range of Victoria Land. It stands at the western end of a line of peaks that mark the divide in the east Cruzen Range. Named by the Advisory Committee on Antarctic Names in 2005 after Robert F. Loewenstein, University of Chicago and Yerkes Observatory; member of the United States Antarctic Program astrophysical research team at Amundsen–Scott South Pole Station for 13 field seasons, from 1991 to 2004.

References

Mountains of Victoria Land